Their Majesties' Bucketeers is a novel by L. Neil Smith published in 1981 as part of his North American Confederacy series.

Plot summary
Their Majesties' Bucketeers is a novel in which Offe Woom investigates the death of a professor on a world inhabited by trisexual tripedal aliens.

Reception
Greg Costikyan reviewed Their Majesties' Bucketeers in Ares Magazine #11 and commented that "Bucketeers is an appealing novel, for three reasons: first, the character of the aliens, who are very human while remaining very alien; second, the Victorian character of their civilization, and third, the apparent verve and enjoyment with which Smith writes."

Reviews
 Review by Jeff Frane (1981) in Locus, #246 July 1981

References

1981 novels
American alternate history novels
American science fiction novels
Social science fiction